Vladinya is a village in Lovech Municipality, Lovech Province, northern Bulgaria.

References

Villages in Lovech Province